Francesco De Stefano (born 1 January 1999) is an Italian footballer plays as a forward.

Career statistics

Notes

References

1999 births
Living people
Italian footballers
Association football forwards
U.S. Città di Pontedera players
A.C. Cuneo 1905 players
Serie C players